Prek Chik is a khum (commune) of Rukhak Kiri District in Battambang Province in north-western Cambodia.

Before January 9, 2009, it was in Moung Ruessei District, Battambang Province.

Villages
Source:

 Siem
 Khnach Ampor
 Chhkae Kham Praeus
 Preaek Ta Ven
 Preaek Chik
 Ou Rumcheck
 Thnam
 Boeng Ampil
 Boeng Thmouy

References

Communes of Battambang province
Moung Ruessei District